Acacia papyrocarpa, commonly known as western myall, is a tree in the family Fabaceae native to arid areas of central and western Australia.

Description
It has fissured grey coloured bark and a dense spreading to rounded crown. It has pendulous and hairy branchlets. Like most Acacia species, it has phyllodes rather than true leaves. The hairy phyllodes are acuminate with a fine curved and innocuous point that is not rigid and have many closely parallel indistinct nerves. It blooms between August and November producing rudimentary inflorescences.

Taxonomy
The species was first formally described by the botanist George Bentham in 1864 as part of the work Flora Australiensis. It was reclassified as Racosperma papyrocarpum by Leslie Pedley in 2003 then transferred back to genus Acacia in 2006. The only other synonyms are Acacia sowdeni and Acacia sowdenii.

Distribution
It is endemic to arid parts of central Australia, it occurs on limestone plains in southern Australia from Paynes Find in Western Australia eastwards into South Australia.  There is also an anomalous specimen at Cooper Creek in Queensland. A weeping form of the species that grows at Roxby Downs, South Australia bears the common name water myall. It is commonly situated on low limestone rises, saline or clay flats where it grows in calcareous sandy loam or clay soils.

See also
List of Acacia species

References

 

Flora of South Australia
Acacias of Western Australia
papyrocarpa
Fabales of Australia
Taxa named by George Bentham